Denise Johnson may refer to:

 Denise Fox, also Johnson, a character from the BBC soap opera EastEnders
 Denise R. Johnson (born 1947), Vermont attorney and judge
 Denise Johnson, singer with Primal Scream